Myloh Jaqory Mason (born June 28, 1990) is an American man who was listed by the Federal Bureau of Investigation (FBI) of the United States within the FBI list of the ten most wanted persons for crimes alleged committed. Mason is described by the FBI as a violent felon.

Crimes
Mason is listed as involved in the following crimes: two attempts of murder in the first degree, aggravated robbery; and attempted second degree kidnapping.

He is accused of multiple bank robberies in which he allegedly used violence, and two occasions criminally fired a gun, which happened during November 2015, within the state of Colorado.

Mason was arrested at a motel in Thornton, Colorado on January 15, 2016.

In November 2016, Mason, along with Miguel David Sanders and Tyrone Javonne Richardson, was found guilty of attempted murder, assault, kidnapping, aggravated robbery, burglary, eluding, and aggravated motor vehicle theft. In December 2016, co-defendant Sanders was sentenced to 371 years in prison.

References

Sources
 
 

American bank robbers
1990 births
American people convicted of attempted murder
American people convicted of assault
American people convicted of kidnapping
American people convicted of burglary
American people convicted of robbery
FBI Ten Most Wanted Fugitives
Living people